Zygmunt Wilhelm Birnbaum (18 October 1903 – 15 December 2000), often known as Bill Birnbaum, was a Polish-American mathematician and statistician who contributed to functional analysis, nonparametric testing and estimation, probability inequalities, survival distributions, competing risks, and reliability theory.

Education and career
After first earning a law degree and briefly practicing law, Birnbaum obtained his PhD in 1929 at the University of Lwów under the supervision of Hugo Steinhaus, and was associated with the Lwów School of Mathematics.  He visited University of Göttingen, Germany from 1929 to 1931, first working as an assistant for Edmund Landau. After studying insurance mathematics and earning a diploma in actuarial science with Felix Bernstein in Göttingen, he worked as an actuary in Vienna during 1931–1932, and was then transferred to Lwów where he continued working as an actuary. After obtaining a position as a correspondent for a Polish newspaper, he arrived in New York as a reporter in 1937. He became a Professor of Mathematics at the University of Washington in 1939 (with help from Harold Hotelling and letters of reference from Richard Courant, Albert Einstein, and Edmund Landau).

Birnbaum was actively involved in reliability work with Boeing through the Boeing Scientific Research Laboratories during the late 1950s and 1960s, and was a key member of the "Seattle school of reliability", a group which also included Tom Bray, Gordon Crawford, James Esary, George Marsaglia, Al Marshall, Frank Proschan, Ron Pyke, and Sam Saunders.

Birnbaum served as Editor of the Annals of Mathematical Statistics (1967–1970) and as President of the Institute of Mathematical Statistics (1964).  He received a Guggenheim Fellowship in 1960 (spent at the Sorbonne, Paris), and a Fulbright Program Fellowship in 1964 (spent at the University of Rome).

Selected publications

Books
 Introduction to Probability and Mathematical Statistics, 1962, Harper and Brothers.

Articles

References

External links
 
 William Birnbaum: MacTutor
 IMS Past Officials
 Zygmunt William Birnbaum papers 1920–2000, University of Washington
 Zygmunt William Birnbaum photograph collection 1930-1990, University of Washington
  UW Mathematics Dept. Newsletter, Autumn 2001
 UW Mathematics Dept. Obituary
 Photo, Z. W. Birnbaum
 Z. W. Birnbaum, Guggenheim Fellowship
 Samuel S. Wilks Award

1903 births
2000 deaths
University of Lviv alumni
Jewish American scientists
American statisticians
Fellows of the American Statistical Association
Presidents of the Institute of Mathematical Statistics
20th-century American mathematicians
20th-century American Jews
Polish emigrants to the United States
University of Washington faculty
People from Lviv
Mathematical statisticians
Functional analysts